Syed Naseer Hussain is an Indian politician of Indian National Congress and a Member of the upper house of the Indian Parliament, the Rajya Sabha, from the state of Karnataka. He served as National Media Panelist (AICC) for the past three years. He also served as National Secretary and Chief Election Authority of Indian Youth Congress. He also served as the Chairman of various committees; Vice-Chairman, two labour boards and Chairman, two sub- committees, Government of India. He is from Bellary.

Early life and background 
Naseer Hussain was born to Syed Hafeez and Akhtar Unnisa on 10 June 1970.

Syed Nasir Hussain Completed his M.A. (Political Science), M.Phil. (International Studies), PhD (International Studies) Educated at St. Philomena's College, Mysore, University of Mysore, Mysore and Jawaharlal Nehru University, New Delhi.

Personal life 
Syed Nasir Hussain married Mehnaz Ansari on 6 October 2003. The couple has two sons.

Political career 
On 23 March 2018, he got elected to the Rajya Sabha by getting 42 first-preference votes out of 185. On 11 August 2021, The Congress party appointed MP Syed Naseer Hussain as a whip of the Parliamentary party in Rajya Sabha. On 15 November 2022, Congress president Mallikarjun Kharge appoints Syed Naseer Hussain and three other MPs as the coordinators of AICC attached with their office.

Position held

Other work 
Dr Syed Naseer Hussain performs the last rites of  Prof Savitri Vishwanathan (Brahmin) who died of COVID-19. Prof Savitri Vishwanathan former head of the Chinese and Japanese Studies Department at Delhi University, was a family friend of Hussain's.

References 

Indian National Congress politicians from Karnataka
Rajya Sabha members from Karnataka
Jawaharlal Nehru University Students' Union
Bellary
1970 births
Living people